The province of Sulawesi was a province in Indonesia that was established after the Proclamation of Indonesian Independence in 1945. It was separated into the province of North and Central Sulawesi and the province of South and Southeast Sulawesi in 1960.

Governors of Sulawesi

Governors after the Province of Sulawesi was dissolved

References

Sulawesi
Sulawesi